The Heathcote Brook Branch is a tributary of Heathcote Brook in southern Middlesex County, New Jersey in the United States.

Heathcote Brook Branch flows generally parallel to Carters Brook, another tributary of Heathcote Brook.

Course
It flows between several housing developments and crosses Promenade Boulevard.

Accessibility
The Heathcote Brook Branch is small and crosses few roads, so it is not easily accessible. However it may be accessed from Heathcote Brook.

Sister tributary
Carters Brook

See also
List of rivers of New Jersey

References

External links
USGS Coordinates in Google Maps

Tributaries of the Raritan River
Rivers of New Jersey
Rivers of Middlesex County, New Jersey